In Māori culture, Matariki is the name of the Pleiades star cluster and the celebration of its first rising in late June or early July. This marks the beginning of the new year in the Māori lunar calendar. 

Historically, Matariki was usually celebrated for a period of days during the last quarter of the moon of the lunar month Pipiri (around June). The ceremony involved viewing the individual stars for forecasts of the year to come, mourning the deceased of the past year, and making an offering of food to replenish the stars. Some Māori use the rise of Puanga (Rigel) or other stars to mark the new year. 

Celebration of Matariki declined during the 20th century, but beginning in the early 1990s it underwent a revival. Matariki was first celebrated as an official public holiday in New Zealand on 24 June 2022.

Name and meaning 
According to Māori tradition, Tāwhirimātea, the god of wind and weather, was enraged by the separation of heaven and earth – his parents, Ranginui and Papatūānuku. Defeated in battle by his brother, Tāwhirimātea fled to the sky to live with Ranginui, but in his anger he first plucked out his eyes as a gesture of contempt towards his siblings, and flung them into the sky, where they remain, stuck to his father's chest. In Māori tradition the unpredictability of the winds is blamed on Tāwhirimātea's blindness.

The word  is the name of both the star cluster and one of the stars within it.

In other Polynesian cultures 
The word matariki or similar, referring to the Pleiades, is found in many Polynesian languages. In the Marquesas the star cluster is known as Matai'i or Mata'iki, in the Cooks as Matariki, and in the Tuamotu archipelago as Mata-ariki. In some languages it has Best's meaning of "little eyes", but in most it is a contraction of mata-ariki, meaning "eyes of the god" or "eyes of the chief". In Hawai'i, the rising of Makali'i in November ushers in the four-month season Makahiki, which honours Lono, the god of agriculture and fertility. In Tahiti, the year was divided into two seasons, named according to whether the Pleiades are visible after sunset: Matari'i i nia (Matari'i above) and Matari'i i raro (Matari'i below). On Rapa Nui, Matariki heralded the New Year, and its disappearance in mid-April ended the fishing season.

The nine stars

To the ancient Greeks, the Pleiades contained nine stars: the parents Atlas and Pleione, positioned to one side of the cluster, and their seven daughters Alcyone, Maia, Taygeta, Electra, Merope, Celaeno and Sterope.

The emblem of the Kingitanga or Māori King movement, Te Paki o Matariki, includes the star Matariki flanked by three stars on each side. The six other stars are sometimes named as Matariki's daughters; it has been suggested that the idea of Matariki as a group of seven female stars was influenced by the concept of the Pleiades' "seven sisters".

The manuscript of Rāwiri Te Kōkau passed on to Rangi Mātāmua recognised nine stars in Matariki, adding Pōhutukawa and Hiwa-i-te-Rangi (also known just as Hiwa) to make a total of eight children, five of which were female and three male. The father of Matariki's children was Rehua, paramount chief of the heavens, identified by Māori as the star Antares.

The stars of Matariki and their genders as recorded by Te Kōkau are identified with particular traits and areas of influence, also reflected in their positions in the star cluster:

The star Pōhutukawa's association with the departed relates to the lone pōhutukawa tree at Te Rerenga Wairua (Cape Reinga), the departing place for the spirits of the deceased as they return to the ancestral homeland of Hawaiki. Mourning the deceased is one component of the Matariki celebration.

Hiwa-i-te-rangi, also known just as Hiwa, is the youngest of Matariki's children and was considered the "wishing star": Māori would rest their hopes and desires on Hiwa, similar to "wishing upon a star", and if it appeared to shine bright and clear on the first viewing of Matariki those individual and collective wishes were likely to be answered.

Māori New Year 

Traditional Māori culture was interwoven with astronomical knowledge, with constellations and the lunar cycle used for navigation, planting and harvesting, delineating the seasons, and marking the spawning and migration of fish.

The Pleiades constellation (Matariki) is visible for most of the year in New Zealand, except for approximately a month in the middle of winter. Matariki finally sets in the west in the early evening in May, and reappears just prior to sunrise in late June or early July, which begins the first month of the Māori lunar calendar, Pipiri (meaning to huddle together). All the months of the Māori calendar are indicated by this heliacal rising of a particular star on the eastern horizon just before dawn, on the night of the new moon: for example, the tenth month, Poutūterangi, is signalled by the heliacal rising of Altair.

In Māori historical recollection, the Tainui canoe was instructed to leave the homeland of Hawaiki for Aotearoa in summer, when Matariki was overhead: this being a direct, ancient historical reference to Māori use of star navigation, for long sea voyaging. Because of these associations with peace and calm, the second Māori king, Matutaera Tāwhiao, chose Matariki as an emblem, and the Kīngitanga newspaper was named .  

Most celebration of Matariki begins in the last quarter phase of the moon after the constellation's first appearance, during 3–4 nights known as "the nights of Tangaroa", and finishes on the night before the new moon. Because Maōri traditionally use a 354-day lunar calendar with 29.5 days to the month, rather than the 356-day Gregorian solar calendar, the dates of Matariki vary each year. Māori did not use a single unified lunar calendar, and different iwi might recognise different numbers of months, give them different names, or start the month on the full moon rather than the new moon.

Puanga and Matariki 
There has also always been regional variation across Aotearoa, in which stars signal the start of the New Year, and what date is chosen to celebrate it. Some iwi (tribes) – specifically those in the far north of Te Ika-a-Māui (the North Island), the mid-western parts of Te Ika-a-Māui around Taranaki, the Chatham Islands, and much of Te Waipounamu (South Island) – celebrate Puanga, using the rising of the brighter star Rigel (Puanga in northern Māori, Puaka in southern Māori) as the marker of the New Year, instead of Matariki. This is sometimes attributed to Puanga being more visible or visible earlier than Matariki, but, as Rangi Mātāmua puts it, "the variation in the rising between Matariki and Puanga is very small, and if the Tangaroa nights of Piripi are observed correctly, then both stars will be seen in the morning sky." It has been suggested that that tradition of Puaka belonged to the first Polynesian settlers to arrive in Aotearoa, and Matariki was brought by a second wave of arrivals, who also brought the first kūmara (with which Matariki is associated).

In Māori tradition the stars Puanga and Matariki were rivals, with Puanga beautifying herself every winter, attempting to be the star beside which the sun rises and signals the New Year, but being eternally frustrated when each year the Sun rose beside Matariki.

Other iwi use Atutahi (Canopus) rather than Puanga, or the setting of Rehua (Antares) in winter, to mark the New Year.

Traditional celebration 
Matariki was an occasion to mourn the deceased, celebrate the present, and prepare the ground for the coming year. The ceremony had three parts: viewing the stars, remembering the deceased, and making an offering of food to the stars. This time of the year was also a good time to instruct young people in the lore of the land and the forest. In addition, certain birds and fish were associated with Matariki: to Tūhoe it marked the beginning of the season where kererū or native pigeon could be captured, cooked, and preserved in its own fat, and the rise of Matariki corresponded with the return of korokoro (lampreys) from the sea to spawn in rivers.

Viewing 
Because of the frequent poor weather in winter, the viewing of Matariki was spread across the three or four nights of Tangaroa to increase the chance that the stars would be clearly seen. The first clear night marked the beginning of festivities. When Matariki reappeared, Māori would look to its stars for a forecast of the coming season's prosperity: if they shone clear and bright, the remaining winter would be warm, but hazy or twinkling stars predicted bad weather in the season ahead. The colour, brightness, and distinctiveness of each star in Matariki would be assessed, and forecasts made according to each of their associations: for example, if Tupu-ā-rangi did not shine clearly then hunters would expect a poor catch of birds in the coming season. Pōhutukawa was linked to the deceased, so its brightness would signal how many people were likely to pass away in the coming year. These predictions were made by tohunga kōkōrangi, learned elders who had studied and debated for many years in a whare kōkōrangi (house of astronomical learning).

Remembering the deceased 
After the forecasts for the year had been read from the stars, the deceased were invoked with tears and song in a ceremony called  ("the reciting of laments"). The names of everyone who had died since Matariki's last rising were recited. Traditionally, Māori believed that the spirits of the dead were collected during the year and at the setting of Matariki in the month of Hautara they were led into the afterlife. On the rising of Matariki at the start of the year, the deceased of the past year were carried up from the underworld and cast up into the night sky to become stars, accompanied by prayers and the recitation of their names. Beginning the mourning for the previous year's departed at Matariki is still reflected in modern Māori mourning practices.

Offering of food 
The reasoning was that Matariki, after shepherding the spirits of the dead up from the underworld and turning the sun back from the winter solstice, would be weak and in need of sustenance. A small hāngi or earth oven was built, with heated stones in a pit on which was placed food, a layer of leaves, and earth. The food was chosen to correspond with the domains of the stars in Matariki: these might include kūmara for Tupuānuku, a bird for Tupuārangi, freshwater fish for Waitī, and shellfish for Waitā. The offering of food was the final part of the ceremony, which ended at sunrise.

Modern observance 

With the colonisation of New Zealand by Pākehā settlers in the 19th century, many traditional Māori practices began to decline. Some aspects of Matariki were incorporated into new religious traditions such as the Ringatū church, but its traditional celebration had almost ceased by the early 20th century. The last of the traditional Matariki celebrations were recorded in the 1940s. Dansey records the ceremony being still practised in the 1880s or 1890s, and gives an account of one elderly New Plymouth woman carrying on the custom on her own until her death in 1941.

The revival of the celebration of Matariki can be traced to the early 1990s, sparked by various Māori iwi and organisations such as the Museum of New Zealand Te Papa Tongarewa. Te Rangi Huata of Ngāti Kahungunu began in 2000 an annual Matariki celebration in Hastings, which attracted 500 people, which reached 15,000 in 2001. In 2001, the Māori Language Commission began a move to "reclaim Matariki, or Aotearoa Pacific New Year, as an important focus for Māori language regeneration". In 2016 Te Wānanga o Aotearoa promoted a new vision of Matariki in a month-long roadshow called "Te Iwa o Matariki" ( being Māori for "nine"), stressing the nine stars recognised by some iwi.

Since then it has increasingly become common practice for people – Māori and non-Māori – and institutions such as schools, libraries, and city councils to celebrate Matariki in a range of ways. These have included concerts, festivals of lights, the illumination of Auckland's Sky Tower, and tree planting. In 2017 Wellington City Council announced they would cancel the Sky Show fireworks held on Guy Fawkes Night for 22 years, and move them to a Matariki cultural festival from July 2018.

The celebrations have taken place over the period of a week or month, anywhere from early June to late August, but increasingly coincide with the winter solstice or the traditional dates of Matariki.

Public holiday

A proposal to make Matariki an official public holiday in New Zealand was made by former Māori Party MP Rahui Katene's member's bill  Bill/Matariki Day Bill, drawn from the ballot in June 2009. The Bill would have fixed the date of a public holiday using the new moon in June; this was later changed to the new moon of the heliacal rising of Matariki when the bill was drawn a month later and set down for introduction into Parliament. Mayor of Waitakere City Bob Harvey supported the call to make Matariki a public holiday to replace Queen's Birthday, along with the Republican Movement of Aotearoa New Zealand, which found none of New Zealand's local authorities held celebrations for Queen's Birthday but many celebrated Matariki. However, the Bill itself did not propose abolishing Queen's Birthday, and was voted down at its first reading.

As part of the National–Māori Party agreement subsequent to the 2011 New Zealand general election, both parties agreed to support a "cultural heritage bill to recognise Matariki/Puanga, and to honour the peace-making heritage established at Parihaka."

On 7 September 2020, Prime Minister Jacinda Ardern pledged to make Matariki a public holiday if the Labour Party were re-elected in the 2020 general election. The proposed public holiday would not be implemented until 2022, during which businesses could recover from the economic impacts of the COVID-19 pandemic in New Zealand. On 4 February 2021, Ardern announced the first date for the public holiday as 24 June 2022. Legislation to give this legal effect would be introduced during the 2021 parliamentary session.

On 2 July 2021, the day the constellation rose, Ardern announced the proposed dates of the holiday for the next 30 years, as determined by a Matariki Advisory Group drawn from iwi across the country. The date of the holiday was formalised as the Friday closest to the 4 days of the nights of Tangaroa in the lunar month Piripi. The dates vary from late June to mid July, but are always on a Friday, to encourage people to travel and spend time with their families, and to give an extra public holiday to people who usually miss out on Mondayised public holidays (e.g. those who normally work Tuesday to Saturday). The date of Matariki varies because the 354-day Māori lunar calendar (with occasional intercalary months) only approximates the 365.24 day solar Gregorian solar calendar.

On 30 September 2021, Associate Minister for Arts, Culture and Heritage Kiri Allan introduced the Te Kāhui o Matariki Public Holiday Bill to make Matariki a public holiday. The bill passed its first reading supported by the Labour, Green and Māori parties, but opposed by National and ACT. The bill passed its third reading on 7 April, and received royal assent on 11 April 2022.

Matariki was first observed as a public holiday on June 24 2022, including a pre-dawn live broadcast of a hautapu ceremony. It was received positively overall by New Zealanders. Its significance is also attributed to being exclusive to New Zealand culture.

In terms of business, work is operated in a similar manner as other public holidays. However, due to the unique cultural significance of the holiday, Māori cultural advisers and academics have warned companies against commercializing Matariki, citing cultural disrespect. Due to its proximity between Queen's Birthday and Labour Day, concerns are made regarding overcommercialisation of Matariki in terms of appropriating the extended public holiday as an opportunity for shopping events, such as the sale of fireworks. There are concerns regarding the impact of commercialization on Matariki in the future, potentially associating the holiday with binge-drinking instead of time with whanau as intended.

See also
 Matariki, a 2010 New Zealand drama film set in Otara, South Auckland
 Makahiki, an ancient Hawaiian New Year festival
 Matrikas, the Seven Mothers in Hindu tradition, often identified with the Krittika (Pleiades) constellation

References

External links
 Matariki at the Māori Language Commission
 Matariki Online Learning Resources from the Museum of New Zealand Te Papa Tongarewa
 Matariki – Māori New Year in Te Ara: the Encyclopedia of New Zealand
 Matariki: Awaiting their Ascent in Tangatawhenua.com
 Matariki Festival
 The First Lunar Month (June – July) at NZ Astronomy
Matariki Public Holiday information from the Ministry of Business, Innovation, and Employment
 

Agricultural deities
Māori mythology
Māori words and phrases
Māori language
New Year celebrations
Public holidays in New Zealand
Observances on non-Gregorian calendars
June observances
July observances
Winter festivals in New Zealand
Winter holidays (Southern Hemisphere)
Māori festivals